Mohammad Saleh Meftah (Persian: محمدصالح مفتاح; born 5 July 1985 in Estahban) is an Iranian jurist, political activist and journalist. He is a member of the Central Council and chairman of Progress and Justice Population of Islamic Iran. He is known as an activist of the Persian-language Twitter community and as someone who makes demands of the authorities. He was born in Estahban, Fars province, and lives in Tehran. He is known as a Principlist political figure and media activist, and he is a member of the Central Council of the Muslim Bloggers Association.

Three days after the appointment of Alireza Zakani as the mayor of Tehran, he complained about Zakani's illegal appointment and demanded the annulment of Zakani's verdict by the Minister of Interior.

Life and education 
He holds a Master of Laws in Public Law and a Master of Islamic Studies from Imam Sadegh University.

Activities 

He started blogging in 2003 and from then on, he began making demands of officials. He established various blogs and received awards from people such as Mohammad-Reza Mahdavi Kani.

With the decline of the blogging era, he began contributing on social media and news agencies. He has received awards for establishing and managing news agencies. Because of his criticism, his website was filtered once for two months, and the IRGC complained about him.

He complained about Alireza Zakani's illegal appointment three days after Zakani was appointed mayor of Tehran, and called for the Interior Minister to annul Zakani's decree.

Production

Television

Radio

Documentary film

References

External links 
 Mohammad Saleh Meftah IMDb
 Official website

Living people
Iranian writers
Iranian radio and television presenters
Iranian activists
Muslim activists
Free speech activists
Iranian politicians
Iranian journalists
Imam Sadiq University alumni
Iranian jurists
People from Fars Province
Iranian revolutionaries
1985 births
Iranian Muslim activists